"Olympic Airways" is the fourth and last single from the album Antidotes by Foals. It was released as a digital download, CD and vinyl on 6 October 2008.

Yannis Philippakis stated that the lyrics are about or at least in connection with London Heathrow Airport. In an interview with NME, Philippakis stated that the song was about feelings of isolation, just wanting to be at home, and not wanting to go outside.

The video was directed by Dave Ma and features friends, crude oil, balloons and an octopus.

"Olympic Airways" was featured on the FIFA 09 soundtrack. It was the only single from Antidotes that did not chart.

Formats and track listings

References

External links
Official website

2008 singles
Foals songs
Sub Pop singles
2008 songs
Transgressive Records singles
Songs written by Yannis Philippakis